Daniel Přibyl (born December 18, 1992) is a Czech professional ice hockey forward, who is currently playing with HC Sparta Praha in the Czech Extraliga (ELH).

Playing career
Undrafted, Přibyl played in his native Czech Republic, with HC Sparta Praha of the Czech Extraliga. After making his professional debut in the 2010–11 season with Praha as an 18-year-old, he was selected in the sixth round, 168th overall, by the Montreal Canadiens in the 2011 NHL Entry Draft.

With his rights later relinquished by the Canadiens, Přibyl opted to continue his career with Sparta Praha, developing into a top-line scoring threat in the Extraliga.

On April 22, 2016, Přibyl was signed by the Calgary Flames of the National Hockey League (NHL), to a two-year, entry level contract as an unrestricted free agent. In his debut North American season in 2016–17, Přibyl was assigned to the Flames American Hockey League affiliate, the Stockton Heat. He appeared in 33 games, contributing offensively with 5 goals and 15 points.

Approaching the final year of his contract for the 2017–18 season, Přibyl was injured in the lead up to training camp, suffering an Anterior Cruciate Ligament tear that required surgery, ruling him out for the entirety of the campaign.

With his career stalling through injury and with the conclusion of his contract with the Flames, Přibyl opted to return home to HC Sparta Praha, agreeing to a one-year contract on May 9, 2018.

International play
He was selected to take part in the 2012 World Junior Ice Hockey Championships for Czech Republic. He contributed with 1 assist in 5 tournament appearances.

Career statistics

Regular season and playoffs

International

References

External links

1992 births
Living people
Czech ice hockey forwards
Montreal Canadiens draft picks
Sportspeople from Písek
HC Sparta Praha players
Stockton Heat players
Czech expatriate ice hockey players in the United States